The Morning Show with Mike and Juliet was an American syndicated morning talk show. Produced by Fox, the show first aired on January 22, 2007, to a number of markets originally through Fox and MyNetworkTV, most in the Fox Television Stations Group. Hosted by Mike Jerrick and Juliet Huddy, the program consisted of celebrity interviews, audience participation, and segments relating to viewers. The last live show aired on June 12, 2009, with reruns continuing through until September 2009.

Overview
Jerrick and Huddy had hosted other news shows in the past, notably DaySide and Fox & Friends Weekend, a weekend morning show, both on the Fox News Channel.

In February 2007, the show was syndicated to many ABC, NBC, CBS and The CW affiliates where a MyNetworkTV or Fox station didn't carry it.

Ratings and cancellation
On January 8, 2009, Bob Cook, president and CEO of 20th Television, announced The Morning Show was cancelled, with new episodes continuing to air until June and reruns following until September.

Social critiques of hosts
Television critics have noted that the program was unique in having two single hosts, who openly play up their marital status, seemingly abandoning traditional dictates that television morning hours be limited to "family values and sanctimony." Thus, the hosts' on-screen personas ("a man who, because he loves the ladies too much or not enough, shuns long-term relationships, and an attractive, over-30 woman who has pursued her career rather than marrying and regrets it") are designed to appeal to single viewers who have previously been uncatered to in the morning. Jerrick is nineteen years Huddy's senior and has a 30-year-old daughter from his marriage, while Huddy, who has been married three times, is currently separated from her third husband after being married only four months. She does not have children.

"Spaghetti Cat" incident
In August 2008, The Morning Show became known for a seemingly bizarre variation of the bleep censor, censoring dialogue in a segment on binge drinking by cutting to a photograph of a cat eating spaghetti.  The occurrence was pointed out on an episode of The Soup on August 15, where even host Joel McHale acknowledged the absurdity of the image, proclaiming the occurrence "for lack of a better word, art", and pointed out that it was not an edited clip (as the show has often done for comedic intent).  A spokesperson dubbed it a "bleep photo", stating that "you're gonna see a lot more of those in the future." The Spaghetti Cat (impersonated by a crude puppet) made several cameo appearances in later episodes of The Soup.

On August 26, 2009 the Spaghetti Cat bleep photo was used again twice in the space of 30 seconds during another segment of The Morning Show, once again apparently to cover up profanity during a discussion. The spaghetti cat also appeared on Fall Out Boy's music video "I Don't Care".

References

External links
Official website

2007 American television series debuts
2009 American television series endings
2000s American television talk shows
English-language television shows
First-run syndicated television programs in the United States
Television series by 20th Century Fox Television